The ensemble recherche is a German classical music ensemble of nine soloists, especially dedicated to contemporary music. Founded in Freiburg im Breisgau in 1985, they premiered some 500 works. They were awarded the Schneider-Schott Music Prize in 1995 and the Rheingau Musikpreis in 1997.

Career 

The ensemble was founded in 1985 and is based in Freiburg. The repertoire is focused on the music of the 20th and 21st century while covering the spectrum from classical modernism and the Darmstadt School to contemporary music, but occasionally also includes works composed before 1700, interpreted from a contemporary perspective. The ensemble premiered some 500 works, including compositions by Hèctor Parra, Brice Pauset, Gérard Pesson and Wolfgang Rihm.

The ensemble plays concerts, especially a concert series in Freiburg. In addition, they participate in film, radio and theater projects, provide courses for instrumentalists and composers in Freiburg and at the Darmstädter Ferienkurse, and hold open rehearsals. Together with the Freiburger Barockorchester, the ensemble recherche has organised the annual Ensemble-Akademie Freiburg for ensemble playing. Current members of the ensemble are Melise Mellinger (violin), Paul Beckett (viola), Åsa Åkerberg (cello), Martin Fahlenbock (flute), Jaime Gonzalez (oboe), Shizuyo Oka (clarinet), Christian Dierstein (percussion), Klaus Steffes-Holländer and Jean-Pierre Collot (piano).

Starting in 1999, the ensemble recherche began commissioning an ongoing series of short In Nomine compositions for the festival Wittener Tage für neue Kammermusik, titled the Witten In Nomine Broken Consort Book. Composers including Brian Ferneyhough, Georg Friedrich Haas, Toshio Hosokawa, György Kurtág, Claus-Steffen Mahnkopf, Gérard Pesson, Robert H.P. Platz, Rolf Riehm, Wolfgang Rihm, Salvatore Sciarrino, Hans Zender, and Walter Zimmermann have submitted works to the collection.

On 22 August 2008, the eightieth birthday of Karlheinz Stockhausen, members of the ensemble played the premiere of Balance, the Seventh Hour of his cycle Klang, for flute, cor anglais, and bass clarinet, in the great hall of the WDR.

Recordings 

The ensemble recorded more than 50 CDs, notably in 1995 Luigi Nono's Guai ai gelidi mostri, György Kurtág's Omaggio, in 2009 Hans Abrahamsen's Winter and Schnee.

Their 2-CD recording of 22 In Nomine pieces (2005) has been reviewed as "... it provides a common reference point for an unusually large collection of German modernist music, and the production by the West German Radio of Cologne is top-notch."

Several recordings were made in collaboration with the broadcaster SWR and its Experimentalstudio, founded in 1971.

Awards 

The ensemble recherche was in 1997 the fourth recipient of the Rheingau Musikpreis, "... in recognition of their services to disseminating contemporary chamber music works, but also to modern classical works and discoveries from the 1920s and 1930s." Their collaboration with composers, vital for the development of chamber and ensemble music was highlighted as well as their sensitive and dramatic approach to the music.

References

External links 
 ensemble recherche website 
 ensemble recherche Schott
 The Ensemble Recherche Mode Records
 ensemble recherche Members mondayeveningconcerts.org 2008
 ensemble recherche WERGO 
Ensemble Recherche Naxos
 Guy Dammann: Ensemble Recherche; Jakob Kullberg / Huddersfield contemporary music festival, The Guardian, 24 November 2010

Chamber music groups
Contemporary classical music ensembles
Musical groups established in 1985
Freiburg im Breisgau
German classical music groups
1985 establishments in West Germany